Edgard Milhaud (14 April 1873 – 4 September 1964) was a French professor of economics, a militant socialist, and a promoter and theoretician of social economy.

Life

Isaac Edgard Milhaud was born on 14 April 1873 in Nîmes, Gard, France.
His parents were Jassuda Léon Milhaud (1839–1901) and Marie Victoire dite Sarah Cerf (1850–1901).
From 1892 to 1896, he studied in Pars at the Sorbonne, Collège de France and Faculté de Droit, studying philosophy, sociology, and political economy.
He received his agrégation in philosophy in 1895. 
He studied in Germany in 1896–99, inquiring into the workers' movement the basis for his book La démocratie socialiste allemande (1902).
He was an economist and a militant socialist.

From 1899 to 1902, Milhaud was an economic adviser in the office in the Minister of Commerce and Industry.
He married  Berthe Louise Marquinot (1880–1978) on 14 April 1901.
Their children were Maurice Edgard, born in 1899, and Germaine Sarah, born in 1901.
In 1902, he was appointed Professor of Political Economy at the University of Geneva.
In 1908, he founded the journal Annales de la Regie directe, an international journal which in 1925 became the "Annales de l'Economie collective". (It is now named the Annals of Public and Cooperative Economics).
He was Director and Editor-in-Chief.
In 1914–18, he was the first doyen of the Faculty of Economic and Social Sciences.

In 1920, Milhaud was asked by the International Labour Organization (ILO) to direct the Survey of Production (1920–24).
In the early 1920s, Albert Thomas and Edgard Milhaud proposed to develop expertise in the ILO on the links between social and economic problems.
As the delegate representing the French employers at the ILO, Robert Pinot despised the proposal, which he called "social control of the economy."
In 1923, Milhaud became a member of the Honorary Committee of the International Co-operative Alliance.
In 1924 he was a member of the Higher Consultative Committee of Commerce and Industry of France.

From 1925 to 1933, Milhaud was Chief of the General Investigations Section of the ILO.
In 1926, he gave a course at the Academy of International Law of The Hague.
In 1926–29, he was President of the Belgian-Luxembourg Mixed Arbitral Tribunal, set up to decide economic questions arising from the Belgo-Luxemburg Economic Convention. 
He was called to this presidency by the Council of the League of Nations.
From 1928 to 1936, he was a member of the National Economic Council of France.
On 20 June 1940, Edgard Milhaud, Adrien Tixier and Jean-Amédée Weber sent a telegram to Marshal Petain in protest against the request for an armistice, asking for the continuation of the war alongside the British.

In 1947, while teaching at the University of Geneva, Milhaud founded the International Centre of Research and Information on the Collective Economy, now known as CIRIEC, to ensure continuity of the Annals of Collective Economy.
In 1948, Milhaud was a candidate for the Nobel Peace Prize.
In 1957, the headquarters of CIRIEC were moved to Liège, Belgium, and Professor Paul Lambert became director.
Edgard Milhaud died on 4 September 1964 in Barcelona, Spain.
In 2010, CIRIEC started to award the €5,000 Edgard Milhaud Prize annually to young doctoral students.

Publications

Notes

Sources

1873 births
1964 deaths
French socialists